Squaloliparis dentatus is a species of snailfish native to the northwestern Pacific Ocean, known from the region from Hokkaido to western Kamchatka. It grows to a length of  SL. It is the only member of its genus.

References

Liparidae
Monotypic fish genera
Fish described in 1988